Pretoria may refer to:

Places
Pretoria, administrative capital of South Africa
Pretoria Pit disaster, a mining disaster at Westhoughton, Lancashire, UK
790 Pretoria, an asteroid

Ships
Pretoria (ship), a privately owned schooner-barge, one of the largest wooden ships ever constructed, launched in 1900 from West Bay, Michigan, US
USS Pretoria (1897), a United States Navy troop transport commissioned in 1919
TS Pretoria, a German cargo liner completed in 1936, requisitioned by the UK in 1945 and later renamed the Empire Orwell

Other
Pretoria (moth), a moth in the family Pyralidae

See also
Petoria - a fictional place in the Family Guy episode "E. Peterbus Unum" (season 2, 2000)